The Douglas DC-8 was an American piston-engined airliner project by Douglas Aircraft. A concept developed more than a decade before the DC-8 jetliner, the piston-engined DC-8 was to have propellers in the tail, an idea first used at Douglas by Edward F. Burton on a fighter project. The airliner project was canceled after development costs made it commercially unviable.

Design and development

Based on the cancelled XB-42, the program began shortly after the end of World War II. It was intended to operate on short- and medium-range routes, carrying between 40 and 48 passengers in a then-novel pressurized cabin (which had been pioneered by the Boeing 307 in 1938, but was still not in standard airline use).

The DC-8 was to use the same Allison V1710s as the XB-42 (these rated at ), fitted below and immediately behind the cockpit. They were to power contra-rotating propellers in the tail, as in the XB-42, by way of driveshafts under the cabin floor (an arrangement reminiscent of the P-39). This arrangement, also proposed for the Douglas Cloudster II general aviation aircraft, reduced drag by 30% and eliminated the problems associated with controlling the aircraft with one engine out. Cabin access would have been by airport stair through a single portside door.

Despite performance predicted to significantly surpass conventional twin airliners, excessive complexity and high development costs (with consequent high sales price and operating costs) meant that less risky types, such as Convair's 240 and Martin's 2-0-2, were preferred, and the DC-8 was dropped before a prototype was built.

Specifications (estimated)

See also

Bibliography
Notes

References

 - Total pages: 721

External links
 DC-8 'Skybus' concept 
 "Your Pin-up Douglas DC-8 Transport", February 1946, Popular Science bottom of page 96, art work Page 97
 "Tail End Propellers Will Push The New Douglas Air Transport", November 1945, Popular Science early article revealing DC-8 design to general public
 "New U.S. Transports" a 1945 Flight article on the DC-8 and Martin 202

Abandoned civil aircraft projects of the United States
Aircraft with contra-rotating propellers
DC-08
Low-wing aircraft
Twin-engined pusher aircraft